Casino Twilight Dogs is the third studio album from Australian band Youth Group, released in Australia by Ivy League Records on 15 July 2006, then in the United States by ANTI- on 30 January 2007. The album came several months after the Australian chart success of the band's cover of Alphaville's "Forever Young", which had been recorded for the soundtrack of the US TV drama The O.C.. "Forever Young" had received extensive radio airplay and become a platinum-selling, No. 1 single in Australia, its success taking the band by surprise as they mixed Casino Twilight Dogs. The song, although different in style to their self-written material, was added as the album's final track.

The album includes one song, "The Destruction of Laurel Canyon", that details a 2005 mudslide in the famous Los Angeles neighbourhood; and another, "TJ", about Aboriginal teenager Thomas "TJ" Hickey", whose death led to the 2004 Redfern riots in Sydney. Drummer Danny Allen said "Start Today Tomorrow" was among a series of songs singer Toby Martin had often played at solo gigs—"ones we hadn't tackled that just sound good on their own with guitar and voice. I've been blown away when I've watched him play some of these songs and it's great one of them is on the record for others to have that experience."

A limited edition CD/DVD version of the album was also released in Australia. The US release of the album features a different track order and replaces "Let It Go" with "Christmas Windows". Music videos were produced for the singles "Forever Young", "Catching & Killing", and "Daisychains".

"Forever Young" was ranked No. 7 on the ARIA Charts list of top 100 singles for 2006; Casino Twilight Dogs peaked at No. 10 on the ARIA Albums Chart and is the band's highest-charting album. It reached No. 32 on the New Zealand Albums Chart.

Track listing

Personnel

Youth Group
 Toby Martin – vocals, guitar
 Cameron Ellison-Elliott – guitar
 Patrick Matthews – bass
 Danny Lee Allen – drums

Additional personnel
 Tim Kevin – keyboards ("Under the Underpass", "Let It Go", "Sorry"), string arrangement ("Start Today Tomorrow")
 Matthew Steffen – double bass ("On a String")
 Shirley Simms – vocals ("Let It Go")
 Carol Kaye – bass, bass 6 ("Start Today Tomorrow")
 Atom – vocals ("The Destruction of Laurel Canyon")
 Wayne Connolly – 12 string, percussion 
 Andrew Lancaster – synthesizer strings ("Forever Young")
 David McCormack – synthesizer strings ("Forever Young")
 Amanda Brown – violin
 Sophie Glasson – cello
 Rowan Smith – violin

Charts

References

2006 albums
Ivy League Records albums
Youth Group albums